The Hellenic Athletics Federation (abbreviated SEGAS) is Greece's governing body for amateur sport.

SEGAS was created in 1897 and has been the principal organiser of many international sporting competitions held in Greece. The association was behind the 1969 and 1982 European Championships, the 1995 European Indoor Championships, the 1986 World Junior Championships, the 1990 IAAF Grand Prix Final, the 1991 Mediterranean Games, the 1994 World Relay Championships, the 1995 World Marathon Cup, many Balkan Games and many European Cups. SEGAS is putting together the Athens Classic Marathon taking place in November this year.

The president of the association was Vassilis Sevastis.

When two Greek sprinters were barred from the Athens Olympics in 2004 for drug abuse, SEGAS set up an independent tribunal to review the ban. 

They are located at 137 Syngrou Avenue, Nea Smirni, Athens.

References

External links
Official website 

Greece
Government agencies of Greece
Ath
National governing bodies for athletics
Sports organizations established in 1897
1897 establishments in Greece
Organizations based in Attica
Nea Smyrni